Carol Bush is an American politician who represented the 70th district in the Oklahoma House of Representatives from 2016 to 2022.

Oklahoma House
Bush was first elected in 2016. In March 2022, Bush announced she would not seek re-election that year and retire at the end of her term.

References

External links

21st-century American politicians
21st-century American women politicians
Living people
Oral Roberts University alumni
Politicians from Tulsa, Oklahoma
Republican Party members of the Oklahoma House of Representatives
Women state legislators in Oklahoma
Year of birth missing (living people)